The Scaphiten-Pläner Formation is a geologic formation in Germany. It preserves fossils dating back to the Cretaceous period.

See also 
 List of fossiliferous stratigraphic units in Germany

References
 

Geologic formations of Germany
Cretaceous Germany